James Rowley French (September 23, 1928 – December 20, 2017) was an American radio personality and producer who has written and produced, as of 2011, over 803 radio shows, including The Adventures of Harry Nile and The Further Adventures of Sherlock Holmes series.

Life and career

French became morning DJ on KIRO (AM) in Seattle in 1959. He later began production of Imagination Theatre, which in 2003 moved to KIXI-AM His syndicated programs are now broadcast on over 120 stations in the U.S. and Canada, and are also heard on the XM Satellite Radio system all over North America.

He made an appearance on NBC's Pandora's Clock (1996) in the role of an Army non-com. He provided the voice for the Scientist in Gunman Chronicles, Father Grigori in Half-Life 2, the Fisherman in Half-Life 2: Lost Coast, Bill in the games Left 4 Dead and Payday: The Heist (as a cameo in the opening cutscene to one of the missions), and Elder Titan in Dota 2.

In late January 2017, it was formally announced via the Imagination Theatre Facebook page that, due to age and health issues, Jim French and his family would be closing down their production company, Jim French Productions, and discontinuing all broadcasts of Imagination Theatre at the end of March 2017. French died on December 20, 2017 at age 89. He was predeceased by his wife Pat, who had died earlier the same year. Imagination Theatre is now produced by Aural Vision, LLC.

Filmography

Video games

See also
 Imagination Theatre

References

External links
Jim French Productions

1928 births
2017 deaths
20th-century American male actors
21st-century American male actors
20th-century American male writers
21st-century American male writers
American dramatists and playwrights
American male dramatists and playwrights
American male radio actors
American male video game actors
American male voice actors
People from Pasadena, California